Diphyllobothriidae is a family of Cestoda (tapeworms). Members of this family are gut parasites of vertebrates. In most species the definitive hosts are marine or aquatic mammals such as cetaceans and pinnipeds, the first intermediate host usually being a crustacean and the second intermediate a fish. The genus Diphyllobothrium is found as an adult in mammals and fish-eating birds, including the domestic cat. The genus Spirometra tends to have a land-dwelling or semi-aquatic vertebrate as its second intermediate host, with the adults usually occurring in felines.

Genera
The World Register of Marine Species lists the following genera:-
Adenocephalus Nybelin, 1931
Baylisia Markowski, 1952
Baylisiella Markowski, 1952
Dibothriocephalus Lühe, 1899
Diphyllobothrium Cobbold, 1858
Flexobothrium Yurakhno, 1989
Glandicephalus Fuhrmann, 1921
Ligula Bloch, 1782
Multiductus Clarke, 1962
Plicobothrium Rausch & Margolis, 1969
Pyramicocephalus Monticelli, 1890
Schistocephalus Creplin, 1829
Spirometra Faust, Campbell & Kellogg, 1929
Tetragonoporus Skryabin, 1961

References

Platyhelminthes families
Cestoda